Steve Smith (born January 11, 1971) is an American former high jumper. He was born in Indianapolis.

At the 1999 Millrose Games he won gold; he won silver at the 1995 Pan American Games and placed second at the 1994 USA Outdoor Track and Field Championships. He also placed second at the 1995 and 1999 USA Indoor Track and Field Championships, and seventh at the 1995 IAAF World Indoor Championships.

He was educated at The Indiana State University, in Terre Haute, Indiana. A four-time NCAA All-American for Indiana State University in the men's high jump event, Smith finished 2nd in the NCAA Men's High Jump three times; He placed second at the 1994 NCAA Outdoor Championship and was named the MVP of the meet.  He placed second at the 1991 and 1992 NCAA Indoor Championships, and fifth at the 1993 NCAA Outdoor Championships.

He still holds the Indiana State University high jump (indoor and outdoor) record(s) at 7’-4.5” (2.25 meters) - INDOOR and 7’-7” (2.31 meters) - OUTDOOR.  A three-time All-Missouri Valley Conference Outdoor selection (1991, 1993, 1994), he won two outdoor MVC championships.  Smith was ranked 3d in the United States in 1994 and 10th in the United States in 1993. In 1994, Indiana State awarded him the Hillman Outstanding Senior Athlete Award.
 
Smith is now a student advisor at the University of Indianapolis.

International competitions

See also
List of Indiana State University people

References
 
 Record Setting High Jumper To Be Inducted Into ISU Athletics Hall of Fame
 University of Indianapolis: Faculty and Staff

1971 births
Living people
American male high jumpers
Indiana State Sycamores men's track and field athletes
Athletes (track and field) at the 1995 Pan American Games
Pan American Games silver medalists for the United States
Pan American Games medalists in athletics (track and field)
Track and field athletes from Indianapolis
Medalists at the 1995 Pan American Games

Track and field athletes from Indiana